Mélodie Collard (born 29 June 2003) is an inactive Canadian tennis player.

On the ITF Junior Circuit, Collard has a career-high combined ranking of 36, achieved on 16 September 2019.

She won her first ITF pro title at the 2019 Challenger de Saguenay, in the doubles draw, partnering Leylah Fernandez.

ITF Circuit

Doubles: 2 (1 title, 1 runner–up)

References

External links
 
 

2003 births
Living people
Canadian female tennis players
Racket sportspeople from Quebec
Sportspeople from Gatineau